Geniascota is a genus of moths of the family Erebidae. The genus was erected by George Hampson in 1926.

Species
Geniascota lacteata Hampson, 1926 southern Nigeria
Geniascota patagiata Hampson, 1926 Kenya, Malawi, Mozambique
Geniascota trichoptycha Hampson, 1926 southern Nigeria

References

Calpinae